Hong Kong 2020 is a political group launched on 24 April 2013 by Anson Chan, former Chief Secretary for Administration, to provide a platform for soliciting views towards consensus on the constitutional changes needed to achieve full universal suffrage in the election of the Chief Executive in 2017 and the elections for the Legislative Council in 2020.

Composition

Convenor:
 Anson Chan, GBM, GCMG, CBE, JP

Members:
 Allen Lee Peng-fei, former Legislative Council member and founding chairman of the Liberal Party
 Elizabeth Bosher, former Deputy Secretary for Constitutional Affairs
 George Cautherley, former government official 
 Johannes Chan Man-mun, SC
 Gladys Veronica Li, SC

Secretariat:
 Research Director – Lee Wing Tat, former Legislative Council member and chairman of the Democratic Party
 Research Officer – Yu Kwun Wai, member of the Civic Party
 Communications Officer – Matthew Chan

See also
 Hong Kong Basic Law Article 45
 Democratic development in Hong Kong
 Pro-democracy camp

References

External links
 Hong Kong 2020

Organizations established in 2013
Political organisations based in Hong Kong
2013 establishments in Hong Kong